The ATP Itaparica Open is a defunct men's tennis tournament that was part of the Grand Prix tennis circuit from 1986 to 1989 and the  ATP Tour in 1990. The event was held in Itaparica, Brazil and was played on outdoor hard courts at Club Med Itaparica.

One Brazilian reached the final, Luiz Mattar in 1987, when he was beaten by Andre Agassi. It was Agassi's first win on the main ATP Tour. In 1990, Mats Wilander won his final career tournament here.

In 1991 the tournament was replaced by the ATP São Paulo.

Results

Singles

Doubles

External links
ATP Tour website

 
Grand Prix tennis circuit
Hard court tennis tournaments
Defunct tennis tournaments in Brazil
ATP Tour
Sport in Bahia
Recurring sporting events established in 1986
Recurring events disestablished in 1990